Billa Billa is a rural locality in the Goondiwindi Region, Queensland, Australia.

Geography
Billa Billa is crossed by the Leichhardt Highway and in the south east by the Gore Highway.  Yarril Creek marks a small section of the boundary in east. The Weir River roughly follows the western extent of Billa Billa.  The majority of the land is used for agriculture.

There are a number of lagoons in the locality:
 Billa Billa Lagoon
 Tangan Lagoon
 Washpool Lagoon

History
The name Billa Billa means pool or reach of water in an unknown Aboriginal dialect.

See also
 List of reduplicated Australian place names

References

Goondiwindi Region
Localities in Queensland